Atlantic is a neighborhood in the Central District of Seattle, Washington, United States. It is the northernmost neighborhood in the Rainier Valley area, located between Mount Baker Ridge and Beacon Hill, and may also be considered part of South Seattle.  It is home to the Judkins Park neighborhood.

Atlantic

Atlantic is triangular, bounded on the north by E Yesler Way, beyond which are Mann and Minor neighborhoods; on the east by Martin Luther King, Jr. Way S, beyond which is Leschi on the Mount Baker Ridge; and on the west by Rainier Avenue S, beyond which is Yesler Terrace and the International District of Downtown Seattle as well as North Beacon Hill (with S Jackson Street and 12th Avenue S filling out a northwest corner).

Judkins Park

Judkins Park is rectangular within Atlantic, bounded on the south by Interstate 90, and on the west by 20th Avenue S.  Judkins Park contains two baseball fields, a soccer field, a playground, and a small water park.  (Like Atlantic, Judkins Park is bounded on the north by E Yesler Way, on the east by Martin Luther King, Jr. Way S.)

The neighborhood suffered greatly during the 1960s through the early 1990s with the disruptions and widenings of Interstate 90 that wiped out many homes in the area and divided the west of the neighborhood.

Notes and references

Bibliography 
   See heading, "Note about limitations of these data".
   Maps "NN-1120S", "NN-1130S", "NN-1140S".Jpg [sic] dated 13 June; "NN-1030S", "NN-1040S".jpg dated 17 June 2002.  Also maps Central Area (Central District) , Downtown , and Beacon Hill .
 
   "The Neighbors project was published weekly in the Seattle Post-Intelligencer from 1996 to 2000.  This page remains available for archival purposes only and the information it contains may be outdated.  For more updated information, please visit our Webtowns section."
   Wilma referenced Washington Department of Transportation, "I-90: The Homestretch, July 1992", Seattle Public Library, Seattle Room;  The Seattle Times, May 29, 1970, p. C-5,

Further reading 

   Links to the following about Judkins Park: "I-90 decimated the neighborhood, but residents rebuilt it", "Bureaucratic snafus kept area in limbo", "Diversity and location are drawing new residents", "Neighbors have kept the faith alive".
   See columns "History": links "More about the Central Area's history", "See photos from the Central Area: New", "Seattle Neighborhoods site" (cityofseattle.net); and "Resources".  Links to local neighborhood weeklies.